Valley Symphony Orchestra is an American symphony orchestra based in McAllen, Texas.  In 2007, it was in its 55th season.  It is sponsored by the South Texas Symphony Association. Peter Dabrowski is the musical director.

External links
 Valley Symphony Orchestra (official site)
Edinburg article in The Handbook of Texas Online

Texas classical music
Musical groups established in 1952
Orchestras based in Texas
1952 establishments in Texas